The Erebegraafplaats Bloemendaal, or Dutch Honorary Cemetery Bloemendaal, is a World War II final resting place in Zuid-Kennemerland National Park in Bloemendaal, Netherlands. Located on the top of a dune, it can be reached by a small path from a parking lot located near the provincial route between Overveen center and Zandvoort.

None of the graves were originally located here. The cemetery is a final resting place for victims of the Nazi occupation who were executed in various places in the dunes. A total of 422 victims were found in 45 locations and of those, 347 have been laid to rest in 41 groups in Erebegraafplaats Bloemendaal. Nearby, nine locations of former group burials are marked with simple granite stones. The cemetery was first used on 27 November 1945 for the reburial of the Dutch resistance fighter Hannie Schaft, with a procession from the Grote Kerk, Haarlem. In 2010 the cemetery was awarded the Rijksmonument status.

List of graves 

Some notable graves:
 Willem Arondeus (1894–1943) – Righteous Among the Nations
 Johannes Lambertus "Jan" Bonekamp (1914–1944)
 Paul Guermonprez (1908–1944) – Dutch Cross of Resistance

 Johan Limpers (1915–1944)
 Marinus Post (1906–1944)
 Hannie Schaft (1920–1945)
 Gerrit van der Veen (1902–1944) – Righteous Among the Nations
 Walraven van Hall (1906–1945) – Righteous Among the Nations

 
 
 
 
 
 
 
 
 
 
 
 
 
 
 
 
 
 
 
 
 
 
 
 
 
 
 
 
 
 
 
 
 
 
 
 
 
 
 
 Johannes Post

Bibliography
 Peter Heere, Arnold Vernooij: De Eerebegraaf-plaats te Bloemendaal. 2005, Sdu Uitgevers ,

References

External links
 Website Eerebegraafplaats Bloemendaal
 

Cemeteries in North Holland
Rijksmonuments in North Holland
Bloemendaal